Noah Cates (born February 5, 1999) is an American professional ice hockey left wing currently playing for the Philadelphia Flyers of the National Hockey League (NHL). Cates was drafted 137th overall by the Flyers in the 2017 NHL Entry Draft.

Playing career
During the 2019–20 season, Cates recorded 14 goals and 19 assists in 34 games for Minnesota Duluth in the National Collegiate Hockey Conference and was named first-team All-NCHC and second-team AHCA All-American.

Following his senior season with the Bulldogs in 2021–22 and having concluded his collegiate career, Cates was signed to a two-year, entry-level contract with the Philadelphia Flyers on March 27, 2022. He made his NHL debut on March 29, in the Flyers' 4–1 loss to the Minnesota Wild. On April 5, Cates scored his first NHL goal in the Flyers' 4-2 loss to the Columbus Blue Jackets.

International play

Cates represented the United States at the 2019 World Junior Ice Hockey Championships, where he recorded one goal and two assists in seven games and won a silver medal. On January 13, 2022, Cates was named to Team USA's roster to represent the United States at the 2022 Winter Olympics.

Personal life
Cates is the younger brother of professional ice hockey player Jackson Cates, who also plays for the Philadelphia Flyers.

Career statistics

Regular season and playoffs

International

Awards and honors

References

External links
 

1999 births
Living people
AHCA Division I men's ice hockey All-Americans
Ice hockey players from Minnesota
Minnesota Duluth Bulldogs men's ice hockey players
Omaha Lancers players
People from Stillwater, Minnesota
Philadelphia Flyers draft picks
Philadelphia Flyers players
Ice hockey players at the 2022 Winter Olympics
Olympic ice hockey players of the United States